Gemma Rose Veronica McCluskie (5 February 1983 – 1 March 2012) was a British television actress. Her most notable role was in the BBC soap opera EastEnders, in which she played Kerry Skinner.

In March 2012, McCluskie disappeared from her home in East London; a few days later, her dismembered body was discovered in the Regent's Canal. In January 2013, her brother, Tony McCluskie, was found guilty of her murder.

Career
McCluskie's best-known role was Kerry Skinner in the BBC soap opera EastEnders, her character appeared between October 2000 and February 2001. In the show, McCluskie's character was a close friend of Zoe Slater (Michelle Ryan) and the great-niece of the recently killed off Ethel Skinner (Gretchen Franklin), and also the girlfriend of long-serving character Robbie Jackson (Dean Gaffney). She also appeared in the TV series No Sweat.

Disappearance and discovery of body 
McCluskie went missing from her East London flat, where she lived with her brother Tony, on 1 March 2012.  She was seen at home with her brother that afternoon, and a subsequent investigation found that she had entered a kebab shop around 8 pm.

A search party of 100 people was organised by McCluskie's cousins on 5 March, which spread out from the east and south of London, attempting to discover information related to McCluskie's disappearance.

A headless torso was found in the Regents Canal on 6 March. The police announced that the torso had been formally identified as McCluskie. On 10 March, a 35-year-old male (later identified as her brother, Tony McCluskie) was charged with her murder. He appeared at Thames Magistrates' Court on 12 March and a preliminary hearing was set for 26 March at the Old Bailey.

On 10 September, police found a severed head in the same stretch of canal. The Metropolitan Police confirmed the head was McCluskie's two days later.

McCluskie's funeral was held on 30 November at St Monica's Roman Catholic Church, Hoxton Square, East London.

Trial and sentence of brother
The trial began on 14 January 2013 at the Old Bailey. During the trial, it was reported that Tony McCluskie was a heavy cannabis user and that the siblings frequently argued. On the 1st of March 2012, he allegedly argued with his sister about an overflowing bath. She told him to leave, and he then grabbed her by the wrists and punched her to the floor, but claimed he had no further recollection of his actions. Her death was caused by several blows to the head with a blunt instrument. He spent several hours dismembering her body. CCTV footage showed him carrying a suitcase the next day; the suitcase contained her remains, which he disposed of in the Regents Park Canal. McCluskie initially admitted manslaughter, but denied murder, citing a "loss of control". He was found guilty of her murder on 30 January 2013 and jailed for life with a minimum sentence of 20 years.

A 2017 episode of Crimes That Shook Britain covered McCluskie's murder.

Filmography
Television

See also
List of solved missing person cases

References

External links

1983 births
2012 deaths
2012 in London
2012 murders in the United Kingdom
2010s missing person cases
Actresses from London
British people of Irish descent
Deaths by beating in the United Kingdom
English murder victims
English soap opera actresses
Female murder victims
Formerly missing people
Missing person cases in London
People murdered in London
Sororicides
Violence against women in London